Rhyothemis triangularis (sapphire flutterer, lesser blue wing) is a species of dragonfly in the family Libellulidae. It is widespread in eastern and southern Asia.

Description and habitat
It is a small blue colored dragonfly with bases of all wings have dark metallic blue patches. This species breeds in well vegetated ponds and similar habitats. From karyotyping it is known to have 13 chromosomes.

See also 
 List of odonates of Sri Lanka
 List of odonates of India
 List of odonata of Kerala

References

 triangularis.html World Dragonflies
 Animal diversity web
 Query Results
 Sri Lanka Biodiversity

External links

Libellulidae
Insects described in 1889